The men's 4 × 340 metres relay event at the 1973 European Athletics Indoor Championships was held on 10 March in Rotterdam. Each athlete ran two laps of the 170 metres track.

Results

References

4 × 400 metres relay at the European Athletics Indoor Championships
Relay